NFL Quarterback Club 2002, also known as NFL QB Club 2002, is a football video game developed by Acclaim Studios Austin and published by Acclaim Entertainment under their Acclaim Sports banner. It is the final game in Acclaim's NFL Quarterback Club series.

Some of the game's key features are:
NFL Quarterback Challenge mode, featuring four head-to-head events: Speed and Mobility, Accuracy, Long Distance Throw and Read & Recognition.
Unlock retired players like John Elway, Dan Marino, Steve Young, Jim Kelly and Phil Simms
31 NFL clubs and over 1500 NFL players.
Play-by-play from Kevin Harlan and color commentary from Bill Maas.
Player models feature blinking eyes, jaw motions, facial expressions and removable helmets.
Player injuries, penalties and weather conditions affect season play and individual player performance.
5 modes of play: Season, Exhibition, Challenge Mode, Playoffs, and Pro Bowl.

Reception

The game received "mixed or average reviews" on both platforms according to the review aggregation website Metacritic.

References

External links

2001 video games
GameCube games
NFL Quarterback Club 2002
PlayStation 2 games
Acclaim Entertainment games
Video games developed in the United States